The Empire Award for Best Horror was an Empire Award presented annually by the British film magazine Empire to honor the best horror film of the previous year. The Empire Award for Best Horror was one of four new Best Film ongoing awards which were first introduced at the 11th Empire Awards ceremony in 2006 (along with Best Comedy, Best Sci-Fi/Fantasy and Best Thriller) with The Descent receiving the award. Get Out  was the last winner in this category in 2018 event. Winners are voted by the readers of Empire magazine.

Winners and nominees
In the list below, winners are listed first in boldface, followed by the other nominees. The number of the ceremony (1st, 2nd, etc.) appears in parentheses after the awards year, linked to the article (if any) on that ceremony.

2000s

2010s

Notes

References

External links

Horror
Awards for best film